CH Las Palmas was an ice hockey team in Las Palmas de Gran Canaria, Spain. They participated in the Superliga Espanola de Hockey Hielo from 1976–1979.

History
The club was founded in 1975, but fielded only a junior team in their inaugural season. For the 1976-77 season, the club entered the Superliga, in which they finished fifth. Las Palmas finished eighth in the Superliga in the 1977-78 season. Due to financial reasons, and poor results, the club folded in 1979.

External links
 1977-78 season on hockeyarchives.info

Ice hockey teams in Spain
Sport in Las Palmas
Ice hockey clubs established in 1975
Sports clubs disestablished in 1979